Santos Vega is a 1971 Argentine historical film directed by Carlos Borcosque Jr. and starring José Larralde, Ana María Picchio and Walter Vidarte. It was the fourth film to be based on the story of Santos Vega.

Cast
 José Larralde as Santos Vega
 Ana María Picchio 
 Walter Vidarte 
 Juan Carlos Galván 
 Carlos Carella 
 Néstor Paternostro 
 Romualdo Quiroga 
 Chela Jordán

References

Bibliography 
 Plazaola, Luis Trelles. South American Cinema. La Editorial, UPR, 1989.

External links 
 

1971 films
Argentine historical films
1970s historical films
1970s Spanish-language films
1970s Argentine films